Hurezani is a commune in Gorj County, Oltenia, Romania. It is composed of five villages: Busuioci, Hurezani, Pegeni, Plopu and Totea de Hurezani.

References

Communes in Gorj County
Localities in Oltenia